The SNCF class BB 20005 locomotive was a prototype locomotive of the BB25150/BB25200 series, transformed from the damaged BB16028 in 1961. After the end of its test period in 1975 it was reinstated with its original equipment under its original number BB16028.

History
After successful tests with BB20004, prototype of BB25500 locomotives, another new series of dual-voltage locomotives was ordered by SNCF: the BB25150 and BB25200 series. These had a higher power than their predecessors, and in order to test the new parts and technology it was decided to rebuild a BB16000 locomotive into dual-voltage.

BB20005 differed from previous prototypes in the way that it had a both complete AC and DC equipment, previous locomotives only having a complete AC equipment and a small DC equipment, limiting their power under 1.5 kV.With a full AC and DC equipment, BB20005 developed nearly 85% of its power under 1.5 kV, which was a great achievement at that time, knowing that only 2 years before BB20004 developed only 45% of its power under 1.5 kV.

References
 

Alstom locomotives
20005
Experimental locomotives
Railway locomotives introduced in 1961
Multi-system locomotives
Standard gauge electric locomotives of France

Passenger locomotives